Ali Sanad (born 31 October 1986) is a Qatari footballer who is a defender . He is a member of the Qatar national football team.

References 

Official Al Sadd Sports Club website
-Annabi

1986 births
Living people
Qatari footballers
Al Sadd SC players
Al-Khor SC players
Al-Arabi SC (Qatar) players
El Jaish SC players
Al-Rayyan SC players
Qatar Stars League players
Association football fullbacks